Malayali Mamanu Vanakkam is a Malayalam language film directed by Rajasenan starring Jayaram, Prabhu, Kalabhavan Mani, Jagathy Sreekumar and Roja. It was released on 22 February 2002. The film was dubbed into Tamil as Gounder Veetu Maapillai, with additional scenes featuring Vadivelu, Vennira Aadai Moorthy, M. S. Bhaskar and Lekhasri.

Plot

Anandakuttan's mother wants her daughter Anandavalli to be with the family for Anandakuttan's marriage to Revathy. So he takes up a trip on to Tamil Nadu in search of his sister and her husband Muniyandi along with his uncle Keshu.

Anandakuttan succeeds in finding his sister and she sends her daughter Parvathy with Anandakuttan to his home town, to prevent her from marrying Kannayya. However, Parvathy assumes that Anandakuttan is in love with her following the Tamil custom of Muraimaman (where uncles do marry their nieces). She falls in love with him and assumes his family also considers her as the fiancée of him without knowing that he was already engaged with Revathy. Anandakuttan wants to make her aware that in Kerala, it is a prohibited relationship as uncles have a fatherly figure without offending her. So he tries to bring Kannayya to his family to make her fall in love with him. However, she doesn't which results in a major issue in the family once they realised that Parvathy loved Anandakuttan.

Cast
 Jayaram as Anandakuttan
 Prabhu as Periyakulam Aruval Kannaiya
 Kalabhavan Mani as Thirupathy Perumal/Muniyandi
 Jagathy Sreekumar as Kesavan, Anandakuttan's younger uncle
 Roja as Parvathi
 Suja Karthika as Revathi
 Srividya as Anandakuttan's mother
 Shobha Mohan as Anandavalli
 Oduvil Unnikrishnan as Narayana Kurup, Anandakuttan's elder uncle
 P.Balachandran as Easwaran Pillai, Revathi's father
 Sudheesh as Kammath (lodge receptionist) 
 Machan Varghese as Chinnaiya 
 Sruthi Nair (Devika Rani) as Vichithra
 Kalliyoor Sasi in a cameo appearance as Anandvalli's first husband

References

2002 films
2000s Malayalam-language films
Films directed by Rajasenan